Cornelia Ioana Deiac (born 20 March 1988) is a Romanian long jumper.

She was born in Oradea. In her early career she won the bronze medal at the 2005 World Youth Championships and finished sixth at the 2006 World Junior Championships. 
She competed in the 2009 European Indoor Championships and 2010 European Athletics Championships without reaching the final.

She qualified with 6.60 meters in the final of 2011 European Indoor Championships where she ranked seventh with 6.46 meters. She ranked fourth with 6.45 meters in the final of 2011 Summer Universiade in Shenzhen (China).

Her outdoor personal best is 6.70 metres, achieved in July 2010 in Bucharest. Her indoor personal best is 6.67 meters, achieved in January 2012 in Bucharest.

Her height is 171 cm and weight 56 kg. She is studying Psychology at Oradea University.

Competition record

References

1988 births
Living people
Romanian female long jumpers
Competitors at the 2009 Summer Universiade
Competitors at the 2011 Summer Universiade
Competitors at the 2013 Summer Universiade
Sportspeople from Oradea